A list of films produced in Italy in 1917 (see 1917 in film):

External links
 Italian films of 1917 at the Internet Movie Database

Italian
1917
Films